Watse Cuperus (1891 – 1966) was a Dutch journalist, writer and translator. He wrote in West Frisian, and his most important work is The golden wire (De gouden tried, 1941–50).

Books 
 1933 : Skeanebûrster folkslibben
 1937 : Lânstoarm XI
 1941–50 : De gouden tried (1941, 1942 e 1950)
 1943 : Oarreheite erfskip
 1946 : Sa't lân opjowt
 1947 : De pipegael (réimpression 1969)
 1948 : Doeke Daen
 1949 : Swart, mar leaflik (réimpression 1969, deuxième réimpression 1998)
 1955 : Hoeder en skiep
 1958 : Striid en segen (romance autobiographic)
 1964 : De sierlike kroan
 1966 : Jild en eare

Books for children 
 1936 : Oarreheite pet (reprinted 1941; 2nd reprinted 1948)

Drama
 1955 : Do silst net stelle, 4 acts
 1956 : Libbensropping, 4 acts
 1966 : The golden wire (De gouden tried), 4 acts

Translations
 1959: Dark but beautiful (Zwart maar lieflijk, from West Frisian Swart mar leaflik)

1891 births
1966 deaths
Dutch educators
Dutch male dramatists and playwrights
Dutch male short story writers
20th-century Dutch short story writers
Dutch autobiographers
West Frisian-language writers
Translators to West Frisian
People from Ferwerderadiel
20th-century translators
20th-century Dutch dramatists and playwrights